Dublin and the Belfast Junction Railway (D&BJct, Irish: Iarnród Bhaile Átha Cliath agus Acomhal Bhéal Feirste) was an Irish gauge railway in Ireland. The company was incorporated in 1845 and opened its line in stages between 1849 and 1853, with the final bridge over the River Boyne opening in 1855.  It linked the Ulster Railway (UR) from Belfast to Portadown and Dublin and Drogheda Railway (D&D) from Drogheda to Dublin, completing the missing link in the Belfast–Dublin line.

History
The Boyne Viaduct at Drogheda was not built until 1854–55, at a cost of £124,000, to the design of Sir John Macneill, who was the consulting engineer for the D&BJct.

Route
The D&BJct line from Drogheda to Portadown connected the Ulster Railway's  –  – Belfast  original line with the Dublin and Drogheda Railway's Dublin Amiens Street – Drogheda line, forming the main line between Dublin and Belfast.

Aftermath
In 1875, the D&BJct merged with the Dublin and Drogheda Railway (D&D), forming the Northern Railway of Ireland. This was in turn one of the companies that amalgamated to form the Great Northern Railway of Ireland in 1876.

References

Sources
 
 
 

Railway companies established in 1845
Railway companies disestablished in 1875
Irish gauge railways
Great Northern Railway (Ireland)
Defunct railway companies of Ireland